Don't Try This at Home is the sixth full-length album by urban folk artist Billy Bragg.

"Sexuality" was released as a single which reached #27 on the UK charts and #2 on the U.S. Modern Rock charts. Johnny Marr of The Smiths co-wrote  "Sexuality" and helped to produce two tracks.

The song "Cindy of a Thousand Lives" is about photographer Cindy Sherman.

"Tank Park Salute" is about his father, Dennis Bragg, who died of lung cancer when Bragg was 18. He said that for a show in Barking, where he grew up, he was so moved by the presence of his mother and brother in the audience that he kept a copy of the lyrics in case he forgot them while performing.

R.E.M.'s Michael Stipe and Peter Buck contribute to "You Woke Up My Neighbourhood." The song was named after a drawing by Woody Guthrie, whose unpublished lyrics were set to music by Bragg and Wilco on the Mermaid Avenue albums a few years later.

"Dolphins" is a cover of the Fred Neil song.

The song "God's Footballer" is about former professional football player Peter Knowles who spent his career at Wolverhampton Wanderers before voluntarily ending his football career to become a Jehovah's Witness.

Track listing
All tracks written by Billy Bragg except where noted.

"Accident Waiting to Happen" – 4:01
"Moving the Goalposts" – 2:34
"Everywhere" (Greg Trooper, Sid Griffin) – 5:01
"Cindy of a Thousand Lives" – 4:15
"You Woke Up My Neighbourhood" (Bragg, Peter Buck) – 3:11
"Trust" – 4:13
"God's Footballer" – 3:04
"The Few" – 3:27
"Sexuality" (Bragg, Johnny Marr) – 3:49
"Mother of the Bride" – 3:36
"Tank Park Salute" – 3:30
"Dolphins" (Fred Neil) – 4:20
"North Sea Bubble" – 3:19
"Rumours of War" – 2:50
"Wish You Were Her" – 2:46
"Body of Water" (Bragg, Philip Wigg aka "Wiggy") – 3:58

Bonus disc track listing
Along with a remastered album, a second bonus disc was released by Yep Roc Records (in the U.S.) and Cooking Vinyl (in the U.K.) in 2006. The new tracks include demos of songs on the album, as well as several other songs, including a cover of The Beatles' "Revolution". Natalie Merchant sings on two tracks.
"Party of God" (Lead vocals by Natalie Merchant) – 4:15
"North Sea Bubble" (demo) – 3:30
"Sexuality" (demo) – 3:54
"Just One Victory" (Todd Rundgren) – 5:31
"Everywhere" – 4:42
"Trust (demo)" – 5:43
"Bread & Circuses" (Natalie Merchant) – 4:28
"Cindy of a Thousand Lives (demo)" – 3:38
"The Few (demo)" – 3:50
"Revolution" (John Lennon, Paul McCartney) – 1:51
"Tighten up your Wig" (with The Athenians and DJ Woody Dee) – 3:18
"MBH" – 2:07
"This Gulf Between Us" – 2:46
"Picadilly Rambler" – 1:49

Personnel
Billy Bragg – vocals, acoustic guitar (1-3, 5-8, 10, 11, 14), electric guitar (1, 4, 6, 8, 11-13, 15, 16), keyboards (4)
Wiggy – electric guitar (1, 5, 8, 11, 13, 15, 16), bass (1, 3, 4, 10, 16), acoustic guitar (4, 10), mandolin (10)
Cara Tivey – piano (3, 11, 12), keyboards (6, 8, 9, 11, 13, 16), background vocals (4, 12, 16)
J. F. T. Hood – drums, percussion (1, 4, 5, 8-10, 13, 15, 16)
Dave Woodhead – flugelhorn (2, 6), trumpet (8)
Amanda Vincent – keyboards (2, 4, 7, 9, 10, 14, 15), piano (14)
Danny Thompson - double bass (12, 15)
Peter Buck – mandolin (3, 5), acoustic guitar (5)
Jody Linscott – percussion (4, 9, 15)
John Keane – pedal steel guitar, bass (5)
Mary Ramsey – viola (6, 14), violin (14)
Steven Lewis - backing vocals (15)
Kirsty MacColl -- backing vocals (4, 9)
James Eller – bass (9, 13)
Julia Palmer – cello (2, 14)
Andy Hobson - bass (4, 8)
Caroline Hall – trombone (8)
Elliet Mackrell – violin (3, 10)
Lorraine Bowen – background vocals (1, 6, 7, 15)
Victoria Taylor Roberts – background vocals (15)
Michael Stipe – background vocals (5)
Andy Szabo – background vocals (15)

Production
Grant Showbiz – production (throughout)
Johnny Marr – production (with Grant Showbiz: 4, 9, 13)
Victor Van Vugt - engineer (except 13)
John Keane - engineer (5, with Victor Van Vugt)
Owen Morris - engineer (9 with Van Vugt; 13), mixing engineer (4)

References

1991 albums
Albums produced by Grant Showbiz
Billy Bragg albums
Elektra Records albums
Go! Discs albums
Cooking Vinyl albums